Fernando Curcio (born January 26, 1981 in Montevideo, Uruguay) is a Uruguayan footballer currently playing for Naval of the Primera División B in Chile.

Teams
  Sud América 2000-2003
  El Tanque Sisley 2004-2005
  Deportivo Malacateco 2006-2007
  Rampla Juniors 2008-2009
  Monagas 2009-2010
  Deportivo Mictlán 2010-2011
  Naval 2012–present

External links
 
 
 Profile at Tenfield Digital 

1981 births
Living people
Uruguayan footballers
Uruguayan expatriate footballers
El Tanque Sisley players
Rampla Juniors players
Monagas S.C. players
Naval de Talcahuano footballers
Primera B de Chile players
Expatriate footballers in Chile
Expatriate footballers in Guatemala
Expatriate footballers in Venezuela
C.D. Malacateco players
Association football forwards